Crematogaster arthurimuelleri is a species of ant in tribe Crematogastrini. It was described by Forel in 1894.

References

arthurimuelleri
Insects described in 1894